The South African Airways Open may refer to:

South African Airways Open (golf)
South African Airways Open (tennis), an ATP Challenger Tour event held in East London, South Africa.